Acraga ciliata is a moth of the family Dalceridae. It is found in Jamaica. It is found in a wide range of habitats, ranging from dry to wet and from sea level to 1,300 meters.

The length of the forewings is 9.5–12 mm for males and 14 mm for females. The forewings are pale luteous, darker the along veins, especially at the end of the cell and along the outer and inner margins. The hindwings are also pale luteous, but slightly lighter than the forewings. Adults are on wing year-round.

References

Dalceridae
Moths described in 1855